Tony Vazquez is an American politician and former educator serving as a member of the California Board of Equalization from the third district. Elected in 2018, he assumed office on January 12, 2019.

Vazquez graduated from the University of Southern California. He worked as a teacher and served as the mayor of Santa Monica, California from 2015 to 2016.

References 

Hispanic and Latino American politicians
Living people
California Democrats
University of Southern California alumni
People from Santa Monica, California
Year of birth missing (living people)